Mariana Guimarães Vieira da Silva (born 8 May 1978) is a Portuguese sociologist and politician who currently serves as Minister of the Presidency in António Costa's XXIII Constitutional Government, effectively No. 2 in the government.

Biography
Mariana Vieira da Silva is the daughter of politician José António Vieira da Silva, himself a government minister in the Socialist cabinets of José Sócrates and António Costa, and economist Margarida Guimarães. She has a brother, Miguel Vieira da Silva, who is a musician. In her youth, between the ages of 9 and 19, Vieira da Silva was a competitive swimmer for Sporting CP, specialising in the demanding 200 metres butterfly stroke.

She earned a licentiate degree in Sociology from ISCTE – University Institute of Lisbon, in 2002, and has not yet concluded her doctorate in Public Policy (she has finished the coursework but has not yet presented her dissertation on the subject of health and education policies in Portugal).

Around the time of the campaign for the 2002 legislative election, she joined the Socialist Party's political movement Movimento Imaginar Portugal; she became a member of the party shortly after that year's electoral loss. From 2005 to 2009, she worked in an advisory capacity in the office of the Minister of Education Maria de Lurdes Rodrigues. From 2009 to 2011, Vieira da Silva served in an adjunct capacity in the office of the Secretary of State Adjunct to the Prime Minister, José Almeida Ribeiro.

In November 2015, she became part of the XXI Constitutional Government as Secretary of State Adjunct to the Prime Minister, until February 2019, when she replaced Maria Manuel Leitão Marques (elected Member of the European Parliament) as Minister of the Presidency and of Administrative Modernisation.

References

1978 births
Living people
Government ministers of Portugal
Women government ministers of Portugal
People from Lisbon
ISCTE – University Institute of Lisbon alumni